Wheeler Station is a station on the METRO Red Line in Houston. The station is located at the intersection of Main Street and Wheeler Street in Midtown.

While construction and funding has not yet been finalized for the METRORail University/Blue Line, transfers between it and the Red Line will occur here if and when the Blue Line is built.

Prior to the construction of the METRORail Purple Line, Wheeler Station was the only station in the system that had platforms that faced each other. UH South/University Oaks station became the second station to implement this platform configuration.

References

METRORail stations
Railway stations in the United States opened in 2004
Midtown, Houston
Railway stations in Harris County, Texas